The Greek-Catholic Church in Giurtelecu Șimleului was a church in Giurtelecu Şimleului, Romania, built in 1819 and demolished in 1973.

Gallery

Footnotes

External links 
  Somlyó-Győrtelek

Giurtelecu Simleului
Churches completed in 1819
Buildings and structures demolished in 1973
Churches in Sălaj County